Associazione Calcio Fiorentina failed to take off under former Brazil national team coach Sebastião Lazaroni, and ended the season in 12th place. The result prompted president Cecchi Gori to sign German star Stefan Effenberg among others for the coming season, also replacing Lazaroni with Luigi Radice. The most significant event in Fiorentina's season was the arrival of Argentine striker Gabriel Batistuta, who was to become Fiorentina's all-time top scorer during his nine years at the club.

Players

Goalkeepers
  Gianmatteo Mareggini
  Alessandro Mannini

Defenders
  Antonio Dell'Oglio
  Mario Faccenda
  Alberto Malusci
  Vittorio Tosto
  Stefano Pioli
  Vincenzo Matrone
  Stefano Carobbi

Midfielders
  Daniele Amerini
  Giuseppe Iachini
  Damiano Moscardi
  Massimo Orlando
  Stefano Salvatori
  Massimiliano Fiondella
  Dunga

Forwards
  Gabriel Batistuta
  Stefano Borgonovo
  Giacomo Banchelli
  Marco Branca
  Fabio Graccaneli
  Daniele Gilardi
  Pietro Maiellaro
  Massimiliano Memmo

Competitions

Serie A

League table

Matches

Coppa Italia

Second round

Round of 16

Statistics

Goalscorers
  Gabriel Batistuta 13
  Marco Branca 5
  Dunga 4
  Stefano Borgonovo 3
  Pietro Maiellaro 3

References

ACF Fiorentina seasons
Fiorentina